The 2014–15 season was the 89th season in the history of the French association football club Chamois Niortais. The senior team competed in Ligue 2, finishing in 11th place. The club also competed in both the Coupe de France and the Coupe de la Ligue, in which they reached the Round of 64 and the First Round respectively.

Competitions

Ligue 2

League table

Results summary

Matches

Coupe de France

Coupe de la Ligue

Appearances and goals
.

References

External links
 Official website

Chamois Niortais F.C. seasons
Chamois Niortais